Kiss Muna is a Philippine television situational comedy series broadcast by GMA Network. Starring Joey de Leon, it premiered on April 29, 2000. The series concluded on September 10, 2001.

Cast and characters

Lead cast
 Joey de Leon as Stanley

Supporting cast
 Elizabeth Oropesa as Amparo aka Ampy
 Jomari Yllana as Third
 Ara Mina as Ara
 Isko Salvador as Kak
 Klaudia Koronel as Ditas
 Gary Estrada as Ver
 Ina Raymundo as Shirly
 Rayver Cruz as Piolo

Recurring cast
 Arnell Ignacio as a fashion designer
 Vivian Velez as a mayor
 Melisse Santiago as Piolo's classmate

References

External links
 

2000 Philippine television series debuts
2001 Philippine television series endings
Filipino-language television shows
GMA Network original programming
Philippine comedy television series
Philippine television sitcoms